Sara Ballantyne (born October 14, 1960) is an American former professional cross-country mountain biker. See most notably finished second at the 1990 UCI Cross-country World Championships. She also won the 1991 UCI XCO World Cup and the 1989 national XCO championships.

She was inducted into the Mountain Bike Hall of Fame in 1992 and the United States Bicycling Hall of Fame in 2014.

Personal life
After retiring from cycling, she operated a massage parlor in Colorado.

Major results

1987
 1st  World Cross-country Championships
 2nd National XCO Championships
1988
 1st  World Cross-country Championships
1989
 1st  World Cross-country Championships
 1st  National XCO Championships
1990
 2nd  UCI World XCO Championships
1991
 1st Overall UCI XCO World Cup
1st Mont-Sainte-Anne
1994
 3rd  UCI World XCO Championships

References

External links

Website

1960 births
Living people
American female cyclists
American mountain bikers
21st-century American women
Downhill mountain bikers